Joel Johnson is an American ice hockey coach. He is the current head coach for St. Thomas and former head coach for the United States women's national ice hockey team.

Coaching career

Bethel University
Johnson served as the men's and women's soccer coach at Bethel University from 2004 to 2006. He also served as the soccer coach where he earned MIAC Coach of the Year honors. He served as the men's ice hockey head coach from 2007 to 2010. Along with his men's hockey responsibilities, he was also the men's golf coach and the inaugural women's golf coach. Johnson posted a career record of 38–34–3 in three seasons with Bethel.

University of Minnesota
Johnson served as the first assistant head coach at Minnesota in 2000. On June 14, 2010, Johnson resigned as head coach at Bethel to return to Minnesota as an assistant head coach. He served as assistant or associate head coach for 16 seasons. During his time with the team, the Gophers won six NCAA championships.

University of St. Thomas
On June 7, 2021, Johnson was named head coach of St. Thomas women's ice hockey team.

Team USA
Johnson served as head coach of the United States women's national under-18 ice hockey team from 2015 to 2018, helping guide the team to four consecutive gold medals. 

On March 1, 2019, Johnson was named an assistant coach for the United States women's national ice hockey team at 2019 IIHF Women's World Championship. On April 16, 2021, Johnson was named interim head coach for the United States women's national ice hockey team at the 2021 IIHF Women's World Championship. 

On July 28, 2021, Johnson was named head coach for the United States women's ice hockey team at the 2022 Winter Olympics.

Head coaching record

References

External links

Living people
Year of birth missing (living people)
Bethel University (Minnesota) alumni
Minnesota Golden Gophers women's ice hockey coaches
People from Woodbury, Minnesota
St. Thomas (Minnesota) Tommies women's ice hockey coaches